The Schwalm is a natural region or landscape unit within the West Hesse Depression and also the smallest basin within it. It is named after the River Schwalm, on whose middle reaches it lies. In the east the Schwalm region is bounded by the Knüll hills, in the south by the northern foothills of the Vogelsberg and, in the west, by the Gilserberg Heights. In the north the Schwalm transitions into the Landsburg Basin.

The natural region sub-unit of the Schwalm has the following sub-sub-units:

In local usage the landscape name "Schwalm" usually just refers to the northern part, i.e. the Wasenberg Terraces and the Schwalmgrund.

References 

Natural regions of Germany
Natural regions of the West Hesse Highlands
Landforms of Hesse
Schwalm-Eder-Kreis
North Hesse